Outernet is a wireless community network based in Poland, in which everyone owns their own node's hardware configured in a mesh network managed by OLSR. Participants must permit routing of other node's data through their routers, which allows building a large maintenance-free and low-cost network infrastructure which is a personal property of its users.

See also
 B.A.T.M.A.N.

External links 
 Outernet project page
 Free Networks list
 node map
 Google group

Wireless network organizations